Abu al-Walid al-Dahdouh (Arabic: أبو الوليد الدحدوح) (died 1 March 2006) was a senior leader of the Palestinian militant group Islamic Jihad and a commander of the group's military wing, the Al-Quds Brigades. He was killed by an Israeli air strike in Gaza City on 1 March 2006 as he drove past the Palestinian finance ministry. The attack took place hours after militants fired a rocket towards the Israeli coastal town of Ashkelon.

References

Year of birth missing
Palestinian militants
2006 deaths
Islamic Jihad Movement in Palestine members